Łagów  is a village in Świebodzin County, Lubusz Voivodeship, in western Poland. It is the seat of the gmina (administrative district) called Gmina Łagów. The village has a population of approximately 1,600.

There is a Knights Hospitaller castle in Łagów, the Castle of the Order of St. John. The village gives its name to a protected area called Łagów Landscape Park.

Notable people 
 Gerhard Domagk, German pathologist and bacteriologist, Nobel Prize laureate

References

Villages in Świebodzin County